The Irish Republican Socialist Movement (IRSM) is an umbrella term for:

 the Irish Republican Socialist Party (IRSP), a Marxist–Leninist Irish republican group formed in 1974 following a split in Official Sinn Fein
 the Irish National Liberation Army (INLA), the paramilitary wing of the IRSP
 the Republican Socialist Youth Movement, the youth wing of the IRSP
 the Irish Republican Socialist Committees of North America, the representation of the IRSM in North America